The 1st season of Jak oni śpiewają, the Polish edition of Soapstar Superstar, started on March 3, 2007 and ended on June 2, 2007. It was broadcast by Polsat. Katarzyna Cichopek and Krzysztof Ibisz as the hosts, and the judges were: Edyta Górniak, Elżbieta Zapendowska and Rudi Schuberth.

Stars

Guest Performances

Scores

Red numbers indicate the lowest score for each week.
Green numbers indicate the highest score for each week.
 indicates the star eliminated that week.
 indicates the returning stars that finished in the bottom two.
 indicates the star who has got immunitet

Average Chart

The Best Score (6.0)

Episodes

Week 1

Running order

Week 2
Individual judges scores in charts below (given in parentheses) are listed in this order from left to right: Edyta Górniak, Rudi Schuberth, Elżbieta Zapendowska.

Running order

Week 3
Individual judges scores in charts below (given in parentheses) are listed in this order from left to right: Edyta Górniak, Elżbieta Zapendowska, Rudi Schuberth, Piotr Szwedes.

Running order

Week 4
Individual judges scores in charts below (given in parentheses) are listed in this order from left to right: Edyta Górniak, Elżbieta Zapendowska, Rudi Schuberth, Dominika Figurska.

Running order

Week 5
Individual judges scores in charts below (given in parentheses) are listed in this order from left to right: Edyta Górniak, Elżbieta Zapendowska, Rudi Schuberth, Małgorzata Lewińska.

Running order

Week 6
Individual judges scores in charts below (given in parentheses) are listed in this order from left to right: Edyta Górniak, Elżbieta Zapendowska, Rudi Schuberth, Małgorzata Ostrowska-Królikowska.

Running order

Week 7
Individual judges scores in charts below (given in parentheses) are listed in this order from left to right: Edyta Górniak, Elżbieta Zapendowska, Rudi Schuberth, Marek Siudym.

Running order

Week 8
Individual judges scores in charts below (given in parentheses) are listed in this order from left to right: Edyta Górniak, Elżbieta Zapendowska, Rudi Schuberth.

Running order

Individual judges scores in charts below (given in parentheses) are listed in this order from left to right: Edyta Górniak, Elżbieta Zapendowska, Rudi Schuberth, Andrzej Nejman.

Running order

Week 9
Individual judges scores in charts below (given in parentheses) are listed in this order from left to right: Edyta Górniak, Elżbieta Zapendowska, Rudi Schuberth.

Running order

Individual judges scores in charts below (given in parentheses) are listed in this order from left to right: Edyta Górniak, Elżbieta Zapendowska, Łukasz Płoszajski.

Running order

Week 10
Individual judges scores in charts below (given in parentheses) are listed in this order from left to right: Edyta Górniak, Elżbieta Zapendowska, Rudi Schuberth.

Running order

Individual judges scores in charts below (given in parentheses) are listed in this order from left to right: Edyta Górniak, Elżbieta Zapendowska, Rudi Schuberth, Włodimierz Matuszak

Running order

Week 11
Individual judges scores in charts below (given in parentheses) are listed in this order from left to right: Edyta Górniak, Elżbieta Zapendowska, Rudi Schuberth.

Running order

Individual judges scores in charts below (given in parentheses) are listed in this order from left to right: Edyta Górniak, Elżbieta Zapendowska, Rudi Schuberth, Marzena Kipel-Sztuka

Running order

Week 12
Individual judges scores in charts below (given in parentheses) are listed in this order from left to right: Edyta Górniak, Elżbieta Zapendowska, Rudi Schuberth, Edyta Herbuś

Running order

Week 13
Individual judges scores in charts below (given in parentheses) are listed in this order from left to right: Edyta Górniak, Elżbieta Zapendowska, Rudi Schuberth, Robert Moskwa

Running order

Other Performance

Running order

Rating Figures

1
2007 Polish television seasons